The 1986 Polish Speedway season was the 1986 season of motorcycle speedway in Poland.

Individual

Polish Individual Speedway Championship
The 1986 Individual Speedway Polish Championship final was held on 14 September at Zielona Góra.

Golden Helmet
The 1986 Golden Golden Helmet organised by the Polish Motor Union (PZM) was the 1986 event for the league's leading riders. The final was held over four rounds.

Junior Championship
 winner - Ryszard Dołomisiewicz

Silver Helmet
 winner - Ryszard Dołomisiewicz

Bronze Helmet
 winner - Piotr Świst

Pairs

Polish Pairs Speedway Championship
The 1986 Polish Pairs Speedway Championship was the 1986 edition of the Polish Pairs Speedway Championship. The final was held on 24 April at Toruń.

Team

Team Speedway Polish Championship
The 1986 Team Speedway Polish Championship was the 1986 edition of the Team Polish Championship. 

Apator Toruń won the gold medal. The team included Wojciech Żabiałowicz.

First League

Second League

References

Poland Individual
Poland Team
Speedway
1986 in Polish speedway